The hard problem of consciousness asks why and how humans have qualia or phenomenal experiences. This is in contrast to the "easy problems" of explaining the physical systems that give humans and other animals the ability to discriminate, integrate information, and so forth. These problems are seen as relatively easy because all that is required for their solution is to specify the mechanisms that  perform such functions. Philosopher David Chalmers writes that even once we have solved all such problems about the brain and experience, the hard problem will still persist. 

The existence of a "hard problem" is controversial. It has been accepted by philosophers of mind such as Joseph Levine, Colin McGinn, and Ned Block and cognitive neuroscientists such as Francisco Varela, Giulio Tononi, and Christof Koch. However, its existence is disputed by philosophers of mind such as Daniel Dennett, Massimo Pigliucci, Thomas Metzinger, Patricia Churchland, and Keith Frankish, and cognitive neuroscientists such as Stanislas Dehaene, Bernard Baars, Anil Seth, and Antonio Damasio.

Overview
David Chalmers first formulated the hard problem in his paper "Facing up to the problem of consciousness" (1995) and expanded upon it in his book The Conscious Mind (1996). His works have proven to be provocative. Some, such as David Lewis and Steven Pinker, have praised Chalmers for his argumentative rigour and "impeccable clarity". Others, such as Daniel Dennett and Patricia Churchland, believe that the hard problem is best seen as a collection of easy problems and will be solved through further analysis of the brain and behaviour.

Consciousness is an ambiguous term. It can be used to mean self consciousness, awareness, the state of being awake, and so on. Chalmers uses Thomas Nagel's definition of consciousness: the feeling of what it is like to be something. Consciousness, in this sense, is synonymous with experience.

Chalmers' formulation 

The problem of consciousness, Chalmers argues, is two problems: the easy problems and the hard problem.

Easy problems 
The easy problems are problems concerned with behaviour, and mechanistic analysis of the relevant neural processes that accompany that behaviour. Examples of these include how sensory systems work, how such data is processed in the brain, how that data influences behaviour or verbal reports, the neural basis of thought and emotion, and so on. These are problems that can be analyzed through "structures and functions".

Chalmers' use of the word easy is "tongue-in-cheek". As Steven Pinker puts it, they are about as easy as going to Mars or curing cancer. "That is, scientists more or less know what to look for, and with enough brainpower and funding, they would probably crack it in this century." The easy problems are amenable to reductive inquiry. They are a logical consequence of lower level facts about the world, similar to how a clock's ability to tell time is a logical consequence of its clockwork and structure, or a hurricane is a logical consequence of the structures and functions of certain weather patterns. A clock, a hurricane, and the easy problems, are all the sum of their parts (as are most things).

Hard problem 
The hard problem, in contrast, is the problem of why and how those processes are accompanied by experience. It may further include the question of why these processes are accompanied by this or that particular experience, rather than some other kind of experience. In other words, the hard problem is the problem of explaining why certain mechanisms are accompanied by conscious experience. For example, why should neural processing in the brain lead to the felt sensations of, say, feelings of hunger? And why should those neural firings lead to feelings of hunger rather than some other feeling (such as, for example, feelings of thirst)?

Chalmers argues that it is conceivable that the relevant behaviours associated with hunger, or any other feeling, could occur even in the absence of that feeling. This suggests that experience is irreducible to physical systems such as the brain. This is the topic of the next section.

How the easy and hard problems are related 

Chalmers believes that the hard problem is irreducible to the easy problems: solving the easy problems will not lead to a solution to the hard problems. This is because the easy problems are problems pertaining to the causal structure of the world, and the hard problem relates to consciousness, and facts about consciousness include facts that go beyond mere causal or structural description.

For example, take the experience of pain. Suppose one were to stub their foot and yelp. In this scenario, the easy problems are the various mechanistic explanations that involve the activity of one's nervous system and brain and its relation to the environment (such as the propagation of nerve signals from the toe to the brain, the processing of that information and how it leads to yelping, and so on). The hard problem is the question of why these mechanisms are accompanied by the feeling of pain, or why these feelings of pain feel the particular way that they do. Chalmers argues that facts about the neural mechanisms of pain, and pain behaviours, do not lead to facts about conscious experience. Facts about conscious experience are, instead, further facts, not derivable from facts about the brain.In other words, Chalmers believes that solving the easy problems will not solve the hard problems. This is because the easy problems concern "structures and functions" whereas the hard problem contains "further facts" that are not reducible to structural or functional analysis. To return to the above example, this would mean that understanding the neural processing underpinning pain would not explain why those neural processes are accompanied by the feeling of pain. So even once one has explained all the relevant facts about neural processing, facts about what it is like to feel pain would remain unexplained.

Here's an example. If one were to program an AI system, the easy problems concern the problems related to discovering which algorithms are required in order to make this system produce intelligent outputs, or process information in the right sort of ways. The hard problem, in contrast, would concern questions as whether this AI system is conscious, what sort of conscious experiences it is privy to, and how and why this is the case. This suggests that solutions to the easy problem (such as how it the AI is programmed) do not automatically lead to solutions for the hard problem (concerning the potential consciousness of the AI).

Chalmers' diagnosis of the situation is that the easy facts concern structural and functional explanations, but facts about consciousness are not derivable from structural and functional facts. So structural and functional descriptions of the world do not fix facts about consciousness. This is because functions and structures of any sort could conceivably exist in the absence of experience. Alternatively, they could exist alongside a different set of experiences. For example, it is logically possible for a perfect replica of Chalmers to have no experience at all, or for it to have a different set of experiences (such as an inverted visible spectrum, so that the blue-yellow red-green axes of its visual field are run backwards). 

The same cannot be said about clocks, hurricanes, or other physical things. In these cases, a structural or functional description is a complete description. A perfect replica of a clock is a clock, a perfect replica of a hurricane is a hurricane, and so on. The difference is that physical things are nothing more than their physical constituents. For example, water is nothing more than H2O molecules, and understanding everything about H2O molecules is to understand everything there is to know about water. But consciousness is not like this. Knowing everything there is to know about the brain, or any physical system, is not to know everything there is to know about consciousness. So consciousness, then, must not be purely physical.

Implications for physicalism 

Chalmers' idea is significant because it contradicts physicalism (sometimes labelled materialism). This is the view that everything that exists is a physical or material thing, so everything can be reduced to microphysical things (such as subatomic particles and the interactions between them). For example, a desk is a physical thing, because it is nothing more than a complex arrangement of a large number of subatomic particles interacting in a certain way. According to physicalism, everything can be explained by appeal to its microphysical constituents, including consciousness. Chalmers' hard problem presents a counterexample to this view, since it suggests that consciousness cannot be reductively explained by appealing to its microphysical constituents. So if the hard problem is a real problem then physicalism must be false, and if physicalism is true then the hard problem must not be a real problem.

Though Chalmers rejects physicalism, he is still a naturalist.

Historical predecessors

The hard problem of consciousness has scholarly antecedents considerably earlier than Chalmers, as Chalmers himself has said. Among others, thinkers who have made arguments similar to Chalmers' formulation of the hard problem include Isaac Newton, John Locke, Gottfried Wilhelm Leibniz, John Stuart Mill, and Thomas Henry Huxley. Likewise, Asian philosophers like Dharmakirti and Guifeng Zongmi discussed the problem of how consciousness arises from unconscious matter.

Commentary on the problem's explanatory targets 
The philosopher Raamy Majeed argued in 2016 that the hard problem is, in fact, associated with two "explanatory targets":
[PQ] Physical processing gives rise to experiences with a phenomenal character.
[Q] Our phenomenal qualities are thus-and-so.

The first fact concerns the relationship between the physical and the phenomenal (i.e., how and why are some physical states felt states), whereas the second concerns the very nature of the phenomenal itself (i.e., what does the felt state feel like?).

Wolfgang Fasching argues that the hard problem is not about qualia, but about pure what-it-is-like-ness of experience in Nagel's sense, about the very givenness of any phenomenal contents itself:

Today there is a strong tendency to simply equate consciousness with the qualia. Yet there is clearly something not quite right about this. The "itchiness of itches" and the "hurtfulness of pain" are qualities we are conscious of. So philosophy of mind tends to treat consciousness as if it consisted simply of the contents of consciousness (the phenomenal qualities), while it really is precisely consciousness of contents, the very givenness of whatever is subjectively given. And therefore the problem of consciousness does not pertain so much to some alleged "mysterious, nonpublic objects", i.e. objects that seem to be only "visible" to the respective subject, but rather to the nature of "seeing" itself (and in today’s philosophy of mind astonishingly little is said about the latter).

Related concepts

"What Is It Like to Be a Bat?" 

The philosopher Thomas Nagel posited in his 1974 paper "What Is It Like to Be a Bat?" that experiences are essentially subjective (accessible only to the individual undergoing them—i.e., felt only by the one feeling them), while physical states are essentially objective (accessible to multiple individuals). So at this stage, he argued, we have no idea what it could even mean to claim that an essentially subjective state just is an essentially non-subjective state (i.e., how and why a felt state is just a functional state). In other words, we have no idea of what reductivism really amounts to. To explain conscious experience within the physicalist framework requires an adequate account. He believes this is impossible, because "every subjective phenomenon is essentially connected with a single point of view, and it seems inevitable that an objective, physical theory will abandon that point of view."

Explanatory gap 

In 1983, the philosopher Joseph Levine proposed that there is an explanatory gap between our understanding of the physical world and our understanding of consciousness. 

Levine's argument is directed at the notion that conscious states are reducible neuronal or brain states. Levine famously uses the example of pain (as an example of a conscious state) is reducible to the firing of c-fibers (a kind of nerve cell). The difficulty is as follows: even if consciousness is physical, it is not clear which physical states correspond to which conscious states. The bridges between the two levels of description will be contingent, rather than necessary. This is significant because in most contexts, relating two scientific levels of descriptions (such as physics and chemistry) is done with the assurance of necessary connections between the two theories (for example, chemistry follows with necessity from physics).

Levine illustrates this point with the following thought experiment. Suppose that humanity were to encounter an alien species, and suppose it is known that the aliens do not have any c-fibers. Even if one knows this, it is not obvious that the aliens do not feel pain: that would remain an open question. This is because the fact that aliens do not have c-fibers does not entail that they do not feel pain (in other words, feelings of pain do not follow with logical necessity from the firing of c-fibers. Levine thinks this and similar thought experiments show that there is an explanatory gap between consciousness and the physical world: even if consciousness is reducible to physical things, consciousness cannot be explained in terms of physical things, because the link between physical things and consciousness is contingent link.

Levine does not think that the explanatory gap means that consciousness is not physical: he is open to the idea that the explanatory gap is only an epistemological problem for physicalism. In contrast, Chalmers thinks that the hard problem of consciousness does show that consciousness is not physical.

Philosophical zombies 

Philosophical zombies are a thought experiment commonly used in discussions of the hard problem. They are hypothetical beings physically identical to humans but that lack conscious experience. Philosophers such as Chalmers, Joseph Levine, and Francis Kripke take zombies as impossible within the bounds of nature but possible within the bounds of logic. This would imply that facts about experience are not logically entailed by the "physical" facts. Therefore, consciousness is irreducible. In Chalmers' words, "after God (hypothetically) created the world, he had more work to do." Daniel Dennett, a philosopher of mind, has criticised the field's use of "the zombie hunch" which he deems an  "embarrassment" that ought to "be dropped like a hot potato".

Knowledge argument 

The knowledge argument, also known as Mary's Room, is another common thought experiment. It centres around a hypothetical neuroscientist named Mary. She has lived her whole life in a black and white room and has never seen colour before. She also happens to know everything there is to know about the brain and colour perception. Chalmers believes that if Mary were to see the colour red for the first time that she would gain new knowledge of the world. That means knowledge of what red looks like is distinct from knowledge of the brain or visual system. In other words knowledge of what red looks like is irreducible to knowledge of the brain or nervous system; therefore, experience is irreducible to the functioning of the brain or nervous system. Others disagree, saying the same could be said about Mary knowing everything there is to know about bikes and riding one for the first time, or swimming, etc. Elsewhere, Thomas Nagel has put forward a "speculative proposal" of devising a language that could "explain to a person blind from birth what it is like to see." If such a language is possible then the force of the knowledge argument may be undercut.

Philosophical responses
Chalmers' formulation of the hard problem of consciousness has provoked considerable debate within philosophy of mind as well as scientific research. Some responses accept the problem as real and seek to develop a theory of consciousness' place in the world that can solve it, while others seek to show that the apparent hard problem as distinct from the easy problems dissolves upon analysis. A third response has been to accept the hard problem as real but deny human cognitive faculties can solve it.

According to a 2020 Philpapers survey, 29.72% of philosophers surveyed believe that the hard problem does not exist, while 62.42% of philosophers surveyed believe that the hard problem is a genuine problem.

Proposed solutions
Different solutions have been proposed to the hard problem of consciousness. One of these, weak reductionism, is the view that while there is an epistemic hard problem of consciousness that will not be solved directly by scientific progress, this is due to our conceptualization, not an ontological gap. A traditional solution gaining renewed popularity is idealism, according to which consciousness is fundamental and not simply an emergent property of matter. It is claimed that this avoids the hard problem entirely. Dualism views consciousness as either a non-physical substance separate from the brain or a non-physical property of the physical brain. Meanwhile, panpsychism and neutral monism, broadly speaking, view consciousness as intrinsic to matter.

Weak reductionism

There is a split among those subscribing to reductive materialism between those who hold there is no hard problem of consciousness—"strong reductionists" (see below)—and "weak reductionists" who, while remaining ontologically committed to physicalism, accept an epistemic hard problem of consciousness. Put differently, weak reductionists believe there is a gap between two ways of knowing (introspection and neuroscience) that will not be resolved by understanding all the underlying neurobiology, but still believe that consciousness and neurobiology are one and the same in reality. For example, Joseph Levine, who formulated the notion of the explanatory gap (see above), states: "The explanatory gap argument doesn't demonstrate a gap in nature, but a gap in our understanding of nature." He nevertheless contends that a full scientific understanding will not close the gap, and that analogous gaps do not exist for other identities in nature, such as that between water and H2O. The philosophers Ned Block and Robert Stalnaker agree that facts about what a conscious experience is like to the one experiencing it cannot be deduced from knowing all the facts about the underlying physiology, but by contrast argue that such gaps of knowledge are also present in many other cases in nature, such as the distinction between water and H2O.

To explain why these two ways of knowing (i.e. third-person scientific observation and first-person introspection) yield such different understandings of consciousness, weak reductionists often invoke the phenomenal concepts strategy, which argues the difference stems from our inaccurate phenomenal concepts (i.e., how we think about consciousness), not the nature of consciousness itself. Thus, the hard problem of consciousness stems only from a dualism of concepts, not a dualism of properties or substances (see next section).

Dualism

Dualism is the view that the mind is irreducible to the physical body. There are multiple dualist accounts of the causal relationship between the mental and the physical, of which interactionism and epiphenomenalism are the most common today. Interactionism posits that the mental and physical causally impact one another, and is associated with the thought of René Descartes (1596–1650). Epiphenomalism, by contrast, holds the mental is causally dependent on the physical, but does not in turn causally impact it. In contemporary philosophy, interactionism has been defended by philosophers including Martine Nida-Rümelin, while epiphenomenalism has been defended by philosophers including Frank Jackson (although Jackson later changed his stance to physicalism). Chalmers has also defended versions of both positions as plausible. Traditional dualists such as Descartes believed the mental and the physical to be two separate substances, or fundamental types of entities (hence "substance dualism"); some more recent dualists, however, accept only one substance, the physical, but state it has both mental and physical properties (hence "property dualism").

Panpsychism and neutral monism

In its most basic form, panpsychism holds that all physical entities have minds (though its proponents in fact take more qualified positions), while neutral monism, in at least some variations, holds that entities are composed of a substance with mental and physical aspects—and is thus sometimes described as a type of panpsychism. Forms of panpsychism and neutral monism were defended in the early twentieth century by the psychologist William James, the philosopher Alfred North Whitehead, the physicist Arthur Eddington, and the philosopher Bertrand Russell, and interest in these views has been revived in recent decades by philosophers including Thomas Nagel, Galen Strawson, and David Chalmers. Chalmers describes his overall view as "naturalistic dualism", but he says panpsychism is in a sense a form of physicalism, as does Strawson. Proponents of panpsychism argue it solves the hard problem of consciousness parsimoniously by making consciousness a fundamental feature of reality.

Objective idealism and cosmopsychism

Objective idealism and cosmopsychism consider mind or consciousness to be the fundamental substance of the universe. Proponents claim that this approach is immune to both the hard problem of consciousness and the combination problem that affects panpsychism.
 
From an idealist perspective, matter is a representation or image of mental processes, and supporters suggest that this avoids the problems associated with the materialist view of mind as an emergent property of a physical brain.

Critics of this approach point out that you then have a decombination problem, in terms of explaining individual subjective experience. In response, Bernardo Kastrup claims that nature has already hinted at a mechanism for this in the condition Dissociative identity disorder (previously known as Multiple Personality Disorder). Kastrup proposes dissociation as an example from nature showing that multiple minds with their own individual subjective experience could develop within a single universal mind.

Cognitive psychologist Donald D. Hoffman uses a mathematical model based around conscious agents, within a fundamentally conscious universe, to support conscious realism as a description of nature that falls within the objective idealism approaches to the hard problem: "The objective world, i.e., the world whose existence does not depend on the perceptions of a particular conscious agent, consists entirely of conscious agents."

David Chalmers has said this form of idealism is one of "the handful of promising approaches to the mind–body problem."

Rejection of the problem
Many philosophers have disputed that there is a hard problem of consciousness distinct from what Chalmers calls the easy problems of consciousness. Some among them, who are sometimes termed strong reductionists, hold that phenomenal consciousness (i.e., conscious experience) does exist but that it can be fully understood as reducible to the brain. Others maintain that phenomenal consciousness can be eliminated from the scientific picture of the world, and hence are called eliminative materialists or eliminativists.

Strong reductionism

Broadly, strong reductionists accept that conscious experience is real but argue it can be fully understood in functional terms as an emergent property of the material brain. In contrast to weak reductionists (see above), strong reductionists reject ideas used to support the existence of a hard problem (that the same functional organization could exist without consciousness, or that a blind person who understood vision through a textbook would not know everything about sight) as simply mistaken intuitions.

A notable family of strong reductionist accounts are the higher-order theories of consciousness. In 2005, the philosopher Peter Carruthers wrote about "recognitional concepts of experience", that is, "a capacity to recognize [a] type of experience when it occurs in one's own mental life," and suggested that such a capacity could explain phenomenal consciousness without positing qualia. On the higher-order view, since consciousness is a representation, and representation is fully functionally analyzable, there is no hard problem of consciousness.

The philosophers Glenn Carruthers and Elizabeth Schier said in 2012 that the main arguments for the existence of a hard problem—philosophical zombies, Mary's room, and Nagel's bats—are only persuasive if one already assumes that "consciousness must be independent of the structure and function of mental states, i.e. that there is a hard problem." Hence, the arguments beg the question. The authors suggest that "instead of letting our conclusions on the thought experiments guide our theories of consciousness, we should let our theories of consciousness guide our conclusions from the thought experiments."

The philosopher Massimo Pigliucci argued in 2013 that the hard problem is misguided, resulting from a "category mistake". He said: "Of course an explanation isn't the same as an experience, but that's because the two are completely independent categories, like colors and triangles. It is obvious that I cannot experience what it is like to be you, but I can potentially have a complete explanation of how and why it is possible to be you."

In 2017, the philosopher Marco Stango, in a paper on John Dewey's approach to the problem of consciousness (which preceded Chalmers' formulation of the hard problem by over half a century), noted that Dewey's approach would see the hard problem as the consequence of an unjustified assumption that feelings and functional behaviors are not the same physical process: "For the Deweyan philosopher, the 'hard problem' of consciousness is a 'conceptual fact' only in the sense that it is a : the mistake of failing to see that the physical can be had as an episode of immediate sentiency."

The philosopher Thomas Metzinger likens the hard problem of consciousness to vitalism, a formerly widespread view in biology which was not so much solved as abandoned. Brian Jonathan Garrett has also argued that the hard problem suffers from flaws analogous to those of vitalism.

Eliminative materialism

Eliminative materialism or eliminativism is the view that many or all of the mental states used in folk psychology (i.e., common-sense ways of discussing the mind) do not, upon scientific examination, correspond to real brain mechanisms. While Patricia Churchland and Paul Churchland have famously applied eliminative materialism to propositional attitudes, philosophers including Daniel Dennett, Georges Rey, and Keith Frankish have applied it to qualia or phenomenal consciousness (i.e., conscious experience). On their view, it is mistaken not only to believe there is a hard problem of consciousness, but to believe consciousness exists at all (in the sense of phenomenal consciousness).

Dennett asserts that the so-called "hard problem" will be solved in the process of solving what Chalmers terms the "easy problems". He compares consciousness to stage magic and its capability to create extraordinary illusions out of ordinary things. To show how people might be commonly fooled into overstating the accuracy of their introspective abilities, he describes a phenomenon called change blindness, a visual process that involves failure to detect scenery changes in a series of alternating images. He accordingly argues that consciousness need not be what it seems to be based on introspection. To address the question of the hard problem, or how and why physical processes give rise to experience, Dennett states that the phenomenon of having experience is nothing more than the performance of functions or the production of behavior, which can also be referred to as the easy problems of consciousness. Thus, Dennett argues that the hard problem of experience is included among—not separate from—the easy problems, and therefore they can only be explained together as a cohesive unit.

In 2013, the philosopher Elizabeth Irvine argued that both science and folk psychology do not treat mental states as having phenomenal properties, and therefore "the hard problem of consciousness may not be a genuine problem for non-philosophers (despite its overwhelming obviousness to philosophers), and questions about consciousness may well 'shatter' into more specific questions about particular capacities."

In 2016, Frankish proposed the term "illusionism" as superior to "eliminativism" for describing the position that phenomenal consciousness is an illusion. In the introduction to his paper, he states: "Theories of consciousness typically address the hard problem. They accept that phenomenal consciousness is real and aim to explain how it comes to exist. There is, however, another approach, which holds that phenomenal consciousness is an illusion and aims to explain why it seems to exist." After offering arguments in favor and responding to objections, Frankish concludes that illusionism "replaces the hard problem with the illusion problem—the problem of explaining how the illusion of phenomenality arises and why it is so powerful."

In 2022, Jacy Reese Anthis published Consciousness Semanticism: A Precise Eliminativist Theory of Consciousness. The consciousness semanticism position, a formulation of eliminative materialism, highlights semantic ambiguity in discussions of consciousness. Anthis argues that while many philosophers have engaged in "intuition jousting," we can instead approach the hard problem with "formal argumentation from precise semantics." On this view, there is no hard problem because consciousness does not exist as a property beyond what can be understood through logical and empirical analysis.

A complete illusionist theory of consciousness must include the description of a mechanism by which the apparently subjective aspect of consciousness is perceived and reported by people. Various philosophers and scientists have proposed possible theories. For example, in his book Consciousness and the Social Brain neuroscientist Michael Graziano advocates what he calls attention schema theory, in which our perception of being conscious is merely an error in perception, held by brains which evolved to hold erroneous and incomplete models of their own internal workings, just as they hold erroneous and incomplete models of their own bodies and of the external world.

Other views
The philosopher Peter Hacker argues that the hard problem is misguided in that it asks how consciousness can emerge from matter, whereas in fact sentience emerges from the evolution of living organisms. He states: "The hard problem isn’t a hard problem at all. The really hard problems are the problems the scientists are dealing with. [...] The philosophical problem, like all philosophical problems, is a confusion in the conceptual scheme." Hacker's critique extends beyond Chalmers and the hard problem and is directed against contemporary philosophy of mind and neuroscience more broadly. Along with the neuroscientist Max Bennett, he has argued that most of contemporary neuroscience remains implicitly dualistic in its conceptualizations and is predicated on the mereological fallacy of ascribing psychological concepts to the brain that can properly be ascribed only to the person as a whole. Hacker further states that "consciousness studies", as it exists today, is "literally a total waste of time":

The whole endeavour of the consciousness studies community is absurd—they are in pursuit of a chimera. They misunderstand the nature of consciousness. The conception of consciousness which they have is incoherent. The questions they are asking don't make sense. They have to go back to the drawing board and start all over again.

New mysterianism

New mysterianism, most significantly associated with the philosopher Colin McGinn, proposes that the human mind, in its current form, will not be able to explain consciousness. McGinn draws on Noam Chomsky's distinction between problems, which are in principle solvable, and mysteries, which human cognitive faculties are unequipped to ever understand, and places the mind-body problem in the latter category. His position is that a naturalistic explanation does exist but that the human mind is cognitively closed to it due to its limited range of intellectual abilities. He cites Jerry Fodor's concept of the modularity of mind in support of cognitive closure.

While in McGinn's strong form, new mysterianism states that the relationship between consciousness and the material world can never be understood by the human mind, there are also weaker forms that argue it cannot be understood within existing paradigms but that advances in science or philosophy may open the way to other solutions (see above). The ideas of Thomas Nagel and Joseph Levine fall into the second category. The cognitive psychologist Steven Pinker has also endorsed this weaker version of the view, summarizing it as follows:

And then there is the theory put forward by philosopher Colin McGinn that our vertigo when pondering the Hard Problem is itself a quirk of our brains. The brain is a product of evolution, and just as animal brains have their limitations, we have ours. Our brains can't hold a hundred numbers in memory, can't visualize seven-dimensional space and perhaps can't intuitively grasp why neural information processing observed from the outside should give rise to subjective experience on the inside. This is where I place my bet, though I admit that the theory could be demolished when an unborn genius—a Darwin or Einstein of consciousness—comes up with a flabbergasting new idea that suddenly makes it all clear to us.

Relationship to scientific frameworks
Most neuroscientists and cognitive scientists believe that Chalmers' alleged hard problem will be solved in the course of solving what he terms the easy problems, although a significant minority disagrees.

Neural correlates of consciousness

Since 1990, researchers including the molecular biologist Francis Crick and the neuroscientist Christof Koch have made significant progress toward identifying which neurobiological events occur concurrently to the experience of subjective consciousness. These postulated events are referred to as neural correlates of consciousness or NCCs. However, this research arguably addresses the question of which neurobiological mechanisms are linked to consciousness but not the question of why they should give rise to consciousness at all, the latter being the hard problem of consciousness as Chalmers formulated it. In "On the Search for the Neural Correlate of Consciousness", Chalmers said he is confident that, granting the principle that something such as what he terms global availability can be used as an indicator of consciousness, the neural correlates will be discovered "in a century or two". Nevertheless, he stated regarding their relationship to the hard problem of consciousness:

One can always ask why these processes of availability should give rise to consciousness in the first place. As yet we cannot explain why they do so, and it may well be that full details about the processes of availability will still fail to answer this question. Certainly, nothing in the standard methodology I have outlined answers the question; that methodology assumes a relation between availability and consciousness, and therefore does nothing to explain it. [...] So the hard problem remains. But who knows: Somewhere along the line we may be led to the relevant insights that show why the link is there, and the hard problem may then be solved.

The neuroscientist and Nobel laureate Eric Kandel wrote that locating the NCCs would not solve the hard problem, but rather one of the so-called easy problems to which the hard problem is contrasted. Kandel went on to note Crick and Koch's suggestion that once the binding problem—understanding what accounts for the unity of experience—is solved, it will be possible to solve the hard problem empirically. However, neuroscientist Anil Seth argued that emphasis on the so-called hard problem is a distraction from what he calls the "real problem": understanding the neurobiology underlying consciousness, namely the neural correlates of various conscious processes. This more modest goal is the focus of most scientists working on consciousness. Psychologist Susan Blackmore believes, by contrast, that the search for the neural correlates of consciousness is futile and itself predicated on an erroneous belief in the hard problem of consciousness.

Integrated information theory

Integrated information theory (IIT), developed by the neuroscientist and psychiatrist Giulio Tononi in 2004 and more recently also advocated by Koch, is one of the most discussed models of consciousness in neuroscience and elsewhere. The theory proposes an identity between consciousness and integrated information, with the latter item (denoted as Φ) defined mathematically and thus in principle measurable. The hard problem of consciousness, write Tononi and Koch, may indeed be intractable when working from matter to consciousness. However, because IIT inverts this relationship and works from phenomenological axioms to matter, they say it could be able to solve the hard problem. In this vein, proponents have said the theory goes beyond identifying human neural correlates and can be extrapolated to all physical systems. Tononi wrote (along with two colleagues):

While identifying the "neural correlates of consciousness" is undoubtedly important, it is hard to see how it could ever lead to a satisfactory explanation of what consciousness is and how it comes about. As will be illustrated below, IIT offers a way to analyze systems of mechanisms to determine if they are properly structured to give rise to consciousness, how much of it, and of which kind.

As part of a broader critique of IIT, Michael Cerullo suggested that the theory's proposed explanation is in fact for what he dubs (following Scott Aaronson) the "Pretty Hard Problem" of methodically inferring which physical systems are conscious—but would not solve Chalmers' hard problem. "Even if IIT is correct," he argues, "it does not explain why integrated information generates (or is) consciousness." Chalmers agrees that IIT, if correct, would solve the "Pretty Hard Problem" rather than the hard problem.

Global workspace theory

Global workspace theory (GWT) is a cognitive architecture and theory of consciousness proposed by the cognitive psychologist Bernard Baars in 1988. Baars explains the theory with the metaphor of a theater, with conscious processes represented by an illuminated stage. This theater integrates inputs from a variety of unconscious and otherwise autonomous networks in the brain and then broadcasts them to unconscious networks (represented in the metaphor by a broad, unlit "audience"). The theory has since been expanded upon by other scientists including cognitive neuroscientist Stanislas Dehaene.

In his original paper outlining the hard problem of consciousness, Chalmers discussed GWT as a theory that only targets one of the "easy problems" of consciousness. In particular, he said GWT provided a promising account of how information in the brain could become globally accessible, but argued that "now the question arises in a different form: why should global accessibility give rise to conscious experience? As always, this bridging question is unanswered." J. W. Dalton similarly criticized GWT on the grounds that it provides, at best, an account of the cognitive function of consciousness, and fails to explain its experiential aspect. By contrast, A. C. Elitzur argued: "While [GWT] does not address the 'hard problem', namely, the very nature of consciousness, it constrains any theory that attempts to do so and provides important insights into the relation between consciousness and cognition."

For his part, Baars writes (along with two colleagues) that there is no hard problem of explaining qualia over and above the problem of explaining causal functions, because qualia are entailed by neural activity and themselves causal. Dehaene, in his 2014 book Consciousness and the Brain, rejected the concept of qualia and argued that Chalmers' "easy problems" of consciousness are actually the hard problems. He further stated that the "hard problem" is based only upon ill-defined intuitions that are continually shifting as understanding evolves:

Once our intuitions are educated by cognitive neuroscience and computer simulations, Chalmers' hard problem will evaporate. The hypothetical concept of qualia, pure mental experience, detached from any information-processing role, will be viewed as a peculiar idea of the prescientific era, much like vitalism... [Just as science dispatched vitalism] the science of consciousness will keep eating away at the hard problem of consciousness until it vanishes.

The meta-problem
In 2018, Chalmers highlighted what he calls the "meta-problem of consciousness", another problem related to the hard problem of consciousness:

The meta-problem of consciousness is (to a first approximation) the problem of explaining why we think that there is a [hard] problem of consciousness.

In his "second approximation", he says it is the problem of explaining the behavior of "phenomenal reports", and the behavior of expressing a belief that there is a hard problem of consciousness.

Explaining its significance, he says:
Although the meta-problem is strictly speaking an easy problem, it is deeply connected to the hard problem. We can reasonably hope that a solution to the meta-problem will shed significant light on the hard problem.  A particularly strong line holds that a solution to the meta-problem will solve or dissolve the hard problem. A weaker line holds that it will not remove the hard problem, but it will constrain the form of a solution.In other words, the 'strong line' holds that the solution to the meta-problem would provide an explanation of our beliefs about consciousness that is independent of consciousness. That would debunk our beliefs about consciousness, in the same way that explaining beliefs about god in evolutionary terms may provide arguments against theism itself.

In popular culture
British playwright Sir Tom Stoppard's play The Hard Problem, first produced in 2015, is named after the hard problem of consciousness, which Stoppard defines as having "subjective First Person experiences".

See also

 Animal consciousness
 Artificial consciousness
 Binding problem
 Blindsight
 Chinese room
 Cogito, ergo sum
 Consciousness causes collapse
 Free will
 Ideasthesia
 Information-theoretic death
 Introspection
 Knowledge by acquaintance
 List of unsolved problems in biology
 Mind–body problem
 Phenomenalism
 Philosophy of self
 Problem of mental causation
 Problem of other minds
 Secondary quality
 Vertiginous question

Notes

References

External links
 

 

Philosophy of mind
Consciousness studies
Mind–body problem
Open problems
Philosophical problems